Eurotrash is a 30-minute magazine-format programme in English, presented by Antoine de Caunes and Jean-Paul Gaultier and produced by Rapido Television. It was shown in the United Kingdom and Republic of Ireland on Channel 4 from 24 September 1993 and was a late-night comical review of unusual topics mainly from Western and Central Europe; though, despite the title, also around the world. The show averaged around a 20 percent audience share, pulling in around 2–3 million viewers each week, making it the most popular entertainment show on the channel. Channel 4's slot average for Eurotrash's broadcast time was around 900,000 viewers, making the show an important hit for the channel at the time.

It ran for 16 series (over 160 episodes) until 2004, making it one of the UK's longest running late-night entertainment shows.

All intellectual property rights to the series are now controlled by the production company, Rapido Television.

A one-off special aired on 17 June 2016 to coincide with the UK's referendum on European Union membership.

History 

The show was conceived in Paris for London-based Rapido Television by producer and director Peter Stuart, son of American film director Mel Stuart. Rapido Television makes over 100 programme titles, mostly for Channel 4, and was originally launched with backing by Richard Branson. The first Eurotrash series were presented by Antoine de Caunes and Jean-Paul Gaultier, with narrative voiceovers by British comic actress Maria McErlane. Gaultier left at the end of series 7 and de Caunes then co-presented with a range of guest presenters for the remainder of the run.

A number of features and stars survived from series one, including Pipi and Popo, two cardboard giraffes made from toilet paper tubes, and the Belgian singer Eddy Wally. Victoria Silvstedt was a semi-regular during 2003, often appearing in the studio with de Caunes to present the Naked Germans of the Week feature. Graham Norton featured as a roving reporter in series 9, Carla Bruni also appeared. Melinda Messenger appeared in the last series as a "roving reporter", always wearing a Union Jack minidress and big red boots.

In 2009, digital channel Living TV began airing a series of new compilation episodes under the title Eurotrash: The Sexy Bits. These included new voiceovers from original narrator Maria McErlane.

Content 

Despite being a big budget show (around £400,000 per hour to make) the programme was surreal and had a deliberate low budget feel. Bright colourful pop-art studio backgrounds used to be built full size, but in later years chromakey was used with model shots, adding to the comical 'trashy' feel. Studio material was shot in Paris. Topics covered included rabbit show jumping, singing dogs, 'nude cleaning services', magicians, porn stars (such as Lolo Ferrari) and Europe's very worst (but usually popular in their host country) bands and singers.

The series was voiced by Maria McErlane (who had also appeared in The Fast Show, a sketch show famous for its 'channel 9' segments, a spoof of European TV channels). Davina McCall provided English voice translations in series 1. In later years Kate Robbins provided voiceovers for the strange continental "stars", which she performed in Yorkshire and other British regional accents and similar quirky anglicised effects. Johnny Daukes, former singer and writer with the indie Band FIN in the 1990s, provided male voices in a similar fashion throughout the series.

One issue had an obituary of Lolo Ferrari that was produced and broadcast with a straight voiceover as a mark of respect, this stood out from the usual comic tone of the programme.

Episodes

UK series

Specials

A Song for Eurotrash
A Song for Eurotrash was a spin-off of Eurotrash broadcast for the first time on 12 May 1998. It was accompanied by an album with the same title containing the following tracks mostly covers of successful songs to mark the Eurovision Song Contest 1998 being held in the UK, plus a title track "A Song for Eurotrash" written for the programme:

Tracklist
Brigitte Bardot – "Saint Tropez" (written by Francis Lai) (1:13)
Kenickie – "Save Your Kisses for Me" (written by Martin Lee, original by Brotherhood of Man) (3:22)
Dubstar feat. Sacha Distel – "Poupée de cire, poupée de son" (written by Serge Gainsbourg, original by France Gall) 3:10)
Edwyn Collins – "Ding-a-dong" (original by Teach-In) (2:38)
Saint Etienne – "La, la, la" (written by Ramón Arcusa, original by Massiel) (3:18)
Dean Martin – "Volare" (written by Franco Migliacci, Domenico Modugno, Mitchell Parish, originally by Domenico Modugno) (2:59)
Terry Hall and Sinéad O'Connor – "All Kinds of Everything" (written by Derry Lindsay, Jackie Ward Smith - original by Dana) (2:43)
Shane MacGowan and The Popes – "What's Another Year" (written by Shay Healy, original by Johnny Logan) (4:01)
Éva Henger – "Ooh Yeah" (written by Shaun Imrei / Peter Stuart) (03:22)	
Fox Force 5 – "A-Ba-Ni-Bi" (written by Nurit Hirsh and Ehud Manor, originally by Izhar Cohen and Alphabeta) (02:58)
Annie Christian – "Congratulations" (written by Phil Coulter / Bill Martin, original by Cliff Richard (4:02)
Bananarama – "Waterloo" (written by Stig Anderson / Benny Andersson / Björn Ulvaeus, original by ABBA) (3:04)
808 State – Variations on "Te Deum" (Eurovision Theme) (5:00)
Kate Robbins – "A Song for Eurotrash" (written by Peter Stuart) (3:37)

See also
 Baadasss TV - another Eurotrash-style show from Rapido TV and Channel 4

References

External links
 "Eurotrash" from Rapido Television's website
 Eurotrash at Channel4.com
 

1993 British television series debuts
2016 British television series endings
1990s British comedy television series
2000s British comedy television series
2010s British comedy television series
Channel 4 comedy
Erotic television series
Nudity in television
English-language television shows